Robert Allen (born Irvine E. Theodore Baehr, March 28, 1906 – October 9, 1998) was an American actor in both feature films and B-movie westerns between 1935 and 1944.

Biography
Allen was born in Mount Vernon, New York and graduated from the New York Military Academy in 1924, where he rode in the academy cavalry. He graduated from Dartmouth College in 1929 with a degree in English. In vacations, he had driven a truck as a labourer. He worked for a bank which failed in the Great Depression. He flew briefly with the Curtis Flying service as a commercial pilot. He first came to the screen in 1926, then signed signing a standard acting contract with Paramount Pictures in 1929. He appeared in the Marx Brothers movie Animal Crackers and several other small parts. Then he signed with Columbia Pictures in 1935. He also later contracted with 20th Century Fox. 

Allen's first notable role was the male lead in Love Me Forever (1935), for which he won a Box Office Award.

After the departure of cowboy star Ken Maynard, Allen was plugged into producer Larry Darmour's formulaic Ranger pictures. Along with sidekick Wally Wales (played by Hal Taliaferro), he redefined the role, starring in six films for director Spencer Gordon Bennet in that year alone. The star was billed as Bob Allen. However, the great success of Wild Bill Elliott in Columbia's 1938 serial The Adventures of Wild Bill Hickok prompted Columbia to drop Bob Allen and replace him with Elliott.

Allen continued to work in pictures as Robert Allen or Robert "Tex" Allen. He had acted on Broadway in the original productions of Show Boat and Kiss Them for Me. In 1956, he appeared in the original production of Auntie Mame. He appeared in other Broadway plays, in touring productions, soap operas, documentaries and commercials. He became a real estate broker in 1964 and returned to the stage from time to time, including an appearance as J.B. Biggley in the 1972 Equity Library Theatre revival of How to Succeed in Business Without Really Trying.

Family
Allen was married twice; the first was to movie actress Evelyn Peirce until her death in 1960. They had two children. Their son, Ted Baehr (born 1946) is a prominent Christian minister and movie critic. They also had a daughter, Katherine Meyer.

Allen died on October 9, 1998, age 92, of complications from cancer in Oyster Bay, New York. He was survived by his son and daughter, seven grandchildren and eight great-grandchildren.

Partial filmography

 The Reckless Hour (1931)
 Saturday's Millions (1933)
 Menace (1934)
 Jealousy (1934)
 The Black Room Mystery (1935)
 Law Beyond the Range (1935)
 Death Flies East (1935)
 Guard That Girl (1935)
 I'll Love You Always (1935)
 Fighting Shadows (1935)
 Air Hawks (1935)
 The Revenge Rider (1935)
 Crime and Punishment (1935)
 White Lies (1935)
 Party Wire (1935)
 Love Me Forever (1935)
 I'm a Father (1935)
 The Life of Lafayette (1936)
 Lady of Secrets (1936)
 Craig's Wife (1936)
 The Unknown Ranger (1936)
 Pride of the Marines (1936)
 The Awful Truth (1937)
 Law of the Ranger (1937)
 Let's Get Married (1937)
 The Big Broadcast of 1938 (1937)
 Reckless Ranger (1937)
 The Rangers Step In (1937)
 Rio Grande Ranger (1937)
 Ranger Courage (1937)
 Penitentiary (1938)
 Keep Smiling (1938)
 Everybody's Baby (1938)
 Up the River (1938)
 Meet the Girls (1938)
 Fighting Thoroughbreds (1939)
 Winter Carnival (1939)
 Winner Take All (1939)
 City of Chance (1940)
 Blazing Guns (1943)
 Death Valley Rangers (1944)
 She Gets Her Man (1945)
 The Web (1947)
 Terror in the City (1964)
 Naked Evil (1966)
 Hells Angels on Wheels (1967)
 Dirtymouth (1970)
 Raiders of the Living Dead (1986)

References

External links

Bob Allen Biography
Columbia in Transition: Bob Allen and Jack Luden at The Old Corral

1906 births
1998 deaths
Aviators from New York (state)
American male film actors
American male soap opera actors
American male stage actors
Dartmouth College alumni
New York Military Academy alumni
Actors from Mount Vernon, New York
Male actors from New York (state)
Deaths from cancer in New York (state)
People from Oyster Bay (town), New York
Columbia Pictures contract players
20th Century Studios contract players
20th-century American male actors
Commercial aviators